Bernard Carton (14 January 1948 – 12 May 2022) was a French politician of the Socialist Party (PS). He served in the General Council of Nord from 1979 to 2011, representing the Canton of Roubaix-Est. From 1988 to 1993, he represented Nord's 7th constituency in the National Assembly.

References

1948 births
2022 deaths
20th-century French politicians
21st-century French politicians
Deputies of the 9th National Assembly of the French Fifth Republic
Departmental councillors (France)
Socialist Party (France) politicians
Sciences Po alumni
People from Roubaix